The Walking Truck  or Cybernetic Walking Machine was an experimental quadruped walking vehicle created by General Electric in 1965. It was designed by Ralph Mosher to help infantry carry equipment over rough terrain. It alternatively bore the name of "CAM", an acronym for "Cybernetic Anthropomorphous Machine". It appeared in a segment of the Walter Cronkite–hosted The 20th Century in 1968.

Operation
The stepping of the robot was controlled by a human operator through foot and hand movements coupled to hydraulic valves. The complex movements of the legs and body pose were done entirely through hydraulics. The hydraulic fluid and pressure was supplied through an off-board system. The walking truck was one of the first technological hardware design applications to incorporate force feed-back to give the operator a feel of what was happening.

As of 2019, the surviving prototype can be seen at the U.S. Army Transportation Museum in Fort Eustis, Virginia. It was exhausting to control and, according to program lead Ralph Mosher who was the designer and primary driver, operators could only drive the walking truck for a limited time.

Modern variants
Plustech, a Finnish subsidiary of American agricultural, construction, and forestry machinery manufacturer John Deere, developed a "Timberjack Walking Machine" or "Walking Tractor" meant to traverse forested terrain. Locomotion is provided by six articulated legs, and it is capable of moving forward, backward, sideways, and diagonally.

See also
 Hardiman, another project of Ralph Mosher's
 BigDog
 Iron Dobbin
 Walker (Star Wars), in particular the AT-AT
 Strandbeesten

References

Further reading

External links
 A photograph of the truck.
 1969 – GE Walking Truck – Ralph Mosher (American), CyberneticZoo.com
 YouTube video of the "CAM"

Robots of the United States
Military vehicles of the United States
Walking vehicles
1960s robots